The 2006–07 BYU Cougars men's basketball team represented Brigham Young University in the 2006–07 college basketball season. This was head coach Dave Rose's second season at BYU. The Cougars competed in the Mountain West Conference and played their home games at the Marriott Center.

Roster

Schedule and results

|-
!colspan=9 style=| Exhibition

|-
!colspan=9 style=| Non-Conference Regular Season

|-
!colspan=9 style=| MWC Regular Season

|-
!colspan=9 style=| MWC tournament

|-
!colspan=9 style=| NCAA tournament

Source

Rankings

References

BYU Cougars men's basketball seasons
BYU Cougars
BYU Cougars men's bask
BYU Cougars men's bask
BYU